The Merchant of Venice is a lost 1914 American silent film historical drama based on William Shakespeare's play. It was directed by and starred Phillips Smalley and Lois Weber, a husband and wife directing team. It was produced and distributed by Universal Film Manufacturing Company.

Cast
Phillips Smalley - Shylock
Lois Weber - Portia
Douglas Gerrard - Bassanio
Rupert Julian - Antonio
Jeanie Macpherson - Nerissa
Edna Maison - Jessica
Fred L. Wilson -

References

External links
 The Merchant of Venice at IMDb.com

1914 films
American silent feature films
Lost American films
Films based on The Merchant of Venice
Films directed by Lois Weber
Universal Pictures films
American black-and-white films
Films directed by Phillips Smalley
American historical drama films
1914 lost films
1910s historical drama films
Lost drama films
1914 drama films
1910s American films
Silent American drama films
1910s English-language films